Patricia Wartusch  (born 5 August 1978) is a former professional tennis player from Austria.

She reached her career-high singles ranking of world No. 65 in 2000. She won in her career two singles and six doubles titles on the WTA Tour.

She won the Austrian Championships three times in a row as a junior, in 1992, 1993 and 1994.

WTA career finals

Singles: 3 (2 titles, 1 runner-up)

Doubles: 12 (6 titles, 6 runner-ups)

ITF Circuit finals

Singles: 13 (5–8)

Doubles: 14 (8–6)

Head-to-head records
 Elena Dementieva: 0–1
 Kim Clijsters: 0–1
 Svetlana Kuznetsova: 1–0
 Arantxa Sánchez Vicario: 0–1
 Serena Williams: 0–1
 Anna Kournikova: 0–1
 Justine Henin: 0–4
 Silvia Farina Elia: 1–0
 Iva Majoli: 0–1

External links
 
 
 

Austrian female tennis players
Sportspeople from Innsbruck
Tennis players from Vienna
1978 births
Living people
Tennis players at the 2000 Summer Olympics
Olympic tennis players of Austria